Daniel L. Miller (born February 9, 1973) is a member of the Pennsylvania House of Representatives, representing the 42nd district as a Democrat.

Miller grew up in Connecticut and intended to pursue a military career. He enlisted in the Army National Guard after high school but was honorably discharged after receiving a severe leg injury. Miller then enrolled in the AmeriCorps program and worked with disadvantaged youths. He then furthered his studies, receiving a bachelor's degree from Western Connecticut State University, and subsequently earning a job as the director of a youth camp.

Miller pursued juris doctor from the Catholic University of America. Upon moving to Pennsylvania, he took a job with the Allegheny County public defender's office. He was elected to the Mt. Lebanon Commission, representing Ward 5, in 2007 and served a four-year term. At the time of his election to the Pennsylvania House, he served as an assistant solicitor in the Allegheny County law department.

Committee assignments 

 Government Oversight
 Rules

References

 http://www.pahouse.com/Miller/?pg=bio

Living people
Democratic Party members of the Pennsylvania House of Representatives
1973 births
Western Connecticut State University alumni
21st-century American politicians